Nocardiopsis metallicus  is an alkaliphilic and metal-mobilizing bacterium from the genus of Nocardiopsis which has been isolated from an alkaline slag dump in Germany.

References

External links 
Type strain of Nocardiopsis metallicus at BacDive -  the Bacterial Diversity Metadatabase

Actinomycetales
Bacteria described in 2002